Sarah Hay (born September 16, 1987) is an American actress and ballerina. She is best known for her role as Claire Robbins in the Starz mini-series Flesh and Bone, she was nominated for a Golden Globe, a Satellite Award and a Critics' Choice Television Award.

Early life
Sarah Hay was brought up in Princeton, New Jersey and New York City, alongside her older brother and sister. Her grandmother was an art dealer in New York City, and her grandfather is a member of the New York Philharmonic. Hay's parents are both psychologists. Her godmother is magician’s assistant Debbie McGee. She began attending dance classes at the age of three and later attended the Jacqueline Kennedy Onassis School of Ballet at the American Ballet Theatre. She later explained that while she was popular at normal school, at the ballet school she was considered to be a "loser" because she wasn't from a wealthy background. She described herself as a "troublemaker" during her childhood, and only decided to pursue ballet professionally when she was a teenager.

Career

Ballet
As a child Hay was enrolled at School of American Ballet. During her early dancing career, she discovered that certain teachers found her body type off-putting, with one handing her a sports bra as she came off stage in the middle of a production, while others suggested that she should undergo breast reduction surgery. She added that she was always considered to be the "heavy girl" in American-based companies.

Once she decided to become a professional ballet dancer, she sacrificed other pursuits, saying in a 2015 interview with the New York Post that she "had a few relationships fall apart because of it." While others have described her as "workaholic," she prefers "motivated." At the age of 22, she moved to Germany to join the Dresden based Semperoper ballet.

Acting
Hay made her acting debut in 1997 when she was cast as Stephanie in You're Invited to Mary-Kate and Ashley's Ballet Party, starring Mary-Kate Olsen and Ashley Olsen. She made her film debut in 2010 as a dancer in Black Swan, but she didn't consider herself to have made an acting appearance until she was cast in the Starz mini-series Flesh and Bone. Executive producer Moira Walley-Beckett and her team had seen more than a thousand ballet dancers for the main role of Claire Robbins, and the choreographer for the series, Ethan Stiefel, had begun requesting ballet footage via email from more dancers. After returning footage, Hay was invited to New York for an audition and was given the part an hour later.

Filmography

Film

Television

Awards and nominations

References

Further reading

External links
 
 Sarah Hay on Instagram
 Sarah Hay on Facebook
 Sarah Hay on Twitter

1987 births
21st-century American actresses
People from Princeton, New Jersey
Living people
American dancers
American ballerinas
School of American Ballet alumni